Siddhānta (सिद्धान्त) is a Sanskrit term denoting the established and accepted view of any particular school within Indian philosophy; literally "settled opinion or doctrine, dogma, axiom, received or admitted truth; any fixed or established or canonical text-book on any subject" (from siddha, adj. mfn.- accomplished, fulfilled; that has attained the highest object, thoroughly skilled or versed in).

Hindu philosophy
This term is an established term within Hindu philosophy which denotes a specific line of development within a Hindu religious or philosophical tradition. The traditional schools of Hindu philosophy have had their siddhạntas established by their respective founders in the form of sūtras (aphorisms). The sūtras are commented by a major philosopher in the respective traditions to elaborate upon the established doctrine by quoting from the śāstras (scriptures) and using logic and pramāṇas (accepted source of knowledge). For example, in the tradition of Vedanta, the author of the Brahma Sūtra was Veda-Vyāsa and the commentators were Ādi Śaṅkara, Rāmānuja and Mādhavācārya (each of whom eventually set up sub-schools within Vedānta). Also, in the tradition of Pūrva Mīmāṁsā, the author of the sūtra was Jaimini and the commentator was Śabarasvāmi.

Buddhist philosophy
Siddhānta (Tibetan: grub mtha') is a genre of Buddhist literature, which is quite common in Tibetan Buddhism. This genre has its antecedents in Pali suttas such as the Tevijja sutta and the Brahmajala sutta. These early Buddhist sources discuss the various worldviews of brahmins, sramanas and ascetics during the Buddha's time. Buddhist scholastic literature later expanded the discussion to numerous other Buddhist and non-Buddhist views. Indian works which discuss various competing doctrines include the Kathavatthu, the Mahavibhasa, Bhaviveka's Blaze of Reasoning and Shantaraksita's Tattvasamgraha.

Tibetan Buddhists developed the genre further and numerous siddhānta works were written by figures such as Rongzompa, Chekawa Yeshe Dorje, Sakya Pandita, Longchenpa, Jamyang Shéba, and Changkya Rölpé Dorjé. According to Daniel Cozort, Jamyang's massive Great Exposition of Tenets "are the most comprehensive of the tenets texts" (in Tibetan Buddhism). During the 18th century, Thuken Losang Chökyi Nyima (1737–1802), a student of Changkya, wrote Crystal Mirror of Philosophical Systems. According to Roger R. Jackson, this text is "arguably the widest-ranging account of religious philosophies ever written in pre-modern Tibet." This work discusses all schools of Tibetan Buddhism, Chinese Buddhism and Chinese religions as well as Indian, Mongolian and Khotanese religious systems.

Jain philosophical studies
For Jainism, the texts vary between the three primary sects, with Sthanakavasis believing in no textual authority. Both the Digambara and Shvetambara believe that the "purest" Jain teachings were contained within the Purvas, which have been mostly lost to antiquity. Of the surviving Jain scriptures, the Digambara tend to focus upon the Prakaranas; while the Shvetambara focus upon the Angas.

Astronomy

In Indian astronomy and astrology, Siddhanta (or Siddhantic) refers to a genre of texts that replaced the earlier tradition based on the Vedanga Jyotisha. The Siddhanta ("established theory") genre emerged around the beginning of the first millennium CE. Compared to the Vedanga Jyotisha, the Siddhanta texts discussed a wider range of topics including the nakshatras, the zodiac signs, precise calculations of the solar year, computations of planetary motions and positions, calculation of solar and lunar eclipses, and parallax.

Early Indian astronomy is transmitted in Siddhantas: Varahamihira (6th century) in his Pancha-Siddhantika contrasts five of these: The Surya Siddhanta besides the Paitamaha Siddhantas (which is more similar to the "classical" Vedanga Jyotisha), the Paulisha and  Romaka Siddhantas (directly based on Hellenistic astronomy) and the  Vasishtha Siddhanta.

References
 Caraka samhita vimana sthana 8/37

Hindu philosophical concepts
Jain philosophical concepts
Vedanta